Emmanuel Magri (also known as Manuel or Manwel; 27 February 1851, in Valletta – 29 March 1907, in Sfax) was a Maltese ethnographer, archaeologist and writer.

Magri gave a significant contribution as a scholar through his collection of Maltese folk tales and lore. Working at the end of the 19th and the turn of the 20th centuries, Magri's work saved for posterity ethnographic material which would have otherwise been lost through modernisation and more widespread education.

Magri was also one of Malta's pioneers in archaeology. He was a member of the first Committee of Management of the Museum of Malta alongside Antonio Annetto Caruana, N. Tagliaferro and Temi Zammit. Magri was entrusted with the excavation of the Hypogeum of Ħal-Saflieni, a Megalithic Temple in Xewkija (Gozo), and a number of other sites in Malta and Gozo. However, during the excavations, a portion of the contents of the Hypogeum, including grave goods and human remains, were emptied out and discarded without being properly catalogued. To confound things further, Magri died in 1907 while conducting missionary work in Tunisia and his report on the Hypogeum was lost.

Born on 27 February 1851 in Valletta, Magri joined the Society of Jesus, in 1871. He was ordained priest in 1881 in Tortosa (Spain), and made the solemn profession of the last vows on 15 August 1890, in Istanbul. As a Jesuit, Magri taught in a number of Jesuit colleges in Malta and Turkey. He also served as Assistant of the Provincial of Sicily (1898–1902) and as Rector of the Seminary in Gozo (1902–1906). Magri died unexpectedly on 29 March 1907 in Sfax, Tunisia, where he had gone to preach Lenten exercises and celebrate Easter with the Maltese community.

See also
List of Jesuit scientists
List of Roman Catholic scientist-clerics

References 
Briffa, Josef Mario 
"Historical Introduction" in E. Magri, Ruins of a Megalithic Temple at Xeuchia (Shewkiyah) Gozo. First report, ed. by Charles Cini SDB, Malta: Salesians and Heritage Malta, 2009, pp. 6-9.

"Patri Manwel Magri u l-Ipoġew", Lil Ħbiebna, Novembru 2003, pp. 195-197.

"New Light on Fr Magri's exploration of the Hypogeum: Notes from correspondence with the British Museum.", Malta Archaeological Review, Issue 6, 41-46. Malta, 2005.

Magri, Emmanuel 
Three Punic Inscriptions re-discovered in Malta. Edited with translation and Commentary, Malta: Government Printing Office, 1901. 

Ruins of a Megalithic Temple at Xeuchia (Shewkiyah) Gozo. First report, Malta, 1906.

Mallia, Salv.
Manwel Magri S.J., Malta: Istitut Komunikazzjoni Socjali, 1978 

"Fr. Manwel Magri's Contribution to the Conservation of Malta's archaeological Heritage", Melita Historica 9 (1985), 145-169.

"Fr. Magri and Conservation: a Postscript", Melita Historica 9 (1985), 245-246.

"Magri, Emmanuel (Manwel)", in Diccionario Histórico de la Compañia de Jesús III, 2472. Roma & Madrid, 2001.

Mifsud Chircop, George 
Manwel Magri – Ħrejjef Missirijietna [critical edition of Magri's folk tales], Malta, 1994.

Citations

External links 
Father Manuel Magri on stamps

1851 births
1907 deaths
Maltese scientists
Maltese male writers
Ethnographers
Maltese archaeologists
Maltese Jesuits
People from Valletta
Jesuit scientists
20th-century Maltese writers
19th-century Maltese writers
19th-century Maltese Roman Catholic priests
Maltese non-fiction writers
Male non-fiction writers